Antonellis is a surname deriving from the name Antonius. Notable people with this surname include the following:

Darcy Antonellis (born 1962), American businesswoman
Valeria De Antonellis, Italian computer science professor

See also

Antonelli

Notes

Italian-language surnames